The 2015 Fordham Rams football team represented Fordham University in the 2015 NCAA Division I FCS football season. They were led by fourth-year head coach Joe Moorhead and played their home games at Coffey Field. They were a member of the Patriot League. They finished the season 9–3, 5–1 in Patriot League play to finish in second place. They received an at-large bid to the FCS Playoffs where they lost in the first round to Chattanooga.

On December 12, head coach Joe Moorhead resigned to become the offensive coordinator at Penn State. He finished at Fordham with a four-year record of 38–13.

Schedule

Source: Schedule

Game summaries

at Army

Villanova

Columbia

Monmouth

at Lafayette

at Penn

Holy Cross

Lehigh

at Colgate

Bucknell

at Georgetown

FCS playoffs

First round – at Chattanooga

Ranking movements

References

Fordham
Fordham Rams football seasons
Fordham
Fordham Rams football